Dionée is a quarterly French-language periodical and the official publication of Association Francophone des Amateurs de Plantes Carnivores, a carnivorous plant society based in France. Typical articles include matters of horticultural interest, field reports, and scientific studies. The Association was established in 1983 and the magazine was founded in 1984 which has been published in full colour from issue 68 (Winter 2007) onwards. It is printed in A5 format and totals around 160 pages annually. New issues are usually released in the months of March, June, September, and December.

Notes

a.Originally called "Association Française d'Amateurs de Plantes Carnivores".

References

External links
  
 Back issues

1984 establishments in France
Carnivorous plant magazines
French-language magazines
Magazines established in 1984
Magazines published in France
Quarterly magazines published in France
Mass media in Rouen